Hell Has No Boundary (魔界) is a 1982 Hong Kong film directed by Chuan Yang.

Plot
Couple Cheng Jung (Derek Yee) and Wong Lai Fen (Leanne Liu) work at the same police station. One night, while camping at an outlying island, Lai Fen hears a strange noise and leaves the campsite to investigate. A green light flashes by in front of her. The next day at work, Lai Fen is visibly out of her element, but her colleagues assume that she is just tired from the trip. The police team rushes to the scene of an emergency hostage situation, and Lai Fen, disobeying orders, opens fire. Her bullet changes direction in the air to chase after the culprit and draw blood...

External links
 
 Hell Has No Boundary at the Hong Kong Movie DataBase
 HK cinemagic entry

Hong Kong horror films
1982 films
1982 horror films
1980s Hong Kong films